The Skopje-Veles dialect is a member of the central subgroup of the Western group of dialects of Macedonian. The dialect is spoken by a larger group of people in the cities Skopje and Veles and in the surrounding villages: Volkovo, Katlanovo, Petrovec and Čaška among others. This dialect is of historical importance for Macedonian because it is considered by many to be a prestige dialect. On August 2, 1945, the Skopje-Veles dialect, together with the other dialects of the central group was officially regulated as a basis of standard Macedonian. Many Macedonian writers and linguists were writing on this dialect and considered it to be standard Macedonian. One of them was Krste Petkov Misirkov and in his book For Macedonian affairs wrote that this dialect should be standard Macedonian. He has been writing on Skopje-Veles dialect and on Prilep-Bitola dialect.

Internal migration to the capital Skopje in the 1950s and 1960s led to the development of a new, urban slang where newly arrived people attempted to incorporate elements of the Skopje-Veles dialect into their own speech, often confusing local elements with those from Serbo-Croatian. Language contact with Serbo-Croatian, then a more prestigious language in SFR Yugoslavia, also reached its height during this period. This variety has been described as a "creolized form of Serbian" (cf. also Surzhyk in Ukraine, Trasianka in Belarus) and is distinct from the 'authentic' Skopje-Veles dialect.

Phonological characteristics
use of  instead of the archaic :  >  ('fear');
emphasis mostly on the antepenultimate syllable in Veles, and less in Skopje;
use of the hard (palatal) l;
use of intervocal :  ('man');
use of the hard sound њ (nj) (in the other dialects of the central group this sound is soft);
use of the letter ќ and ѓ (in the others dialects of the central group the cluster јќ and јѓ is found):  –  ('house').

Morphological characteristics
use of the preposition во (vo) or в (v);
use of the grammatical construction have + past participle:  ('I have worked');
use of three articles.

Examples of the Skopje-Veles dialect
The poem "A voice from Macedonia" by Kole Nedelkovski is probably one of the most famous texts written in the Skopje-Veles dialect.

Skopje dialect

Veles dialect

References

See also
 Macedonian language
 Macedonian dialects

Dialects of the Macedonian language